Auburn is a census-designated place (CDP) in Salem County, New Jersey, United States. It includes the unincorporated community of Auburn in Oldmans Township and extends southeast to include rural and semi-suburban land in Pilesgrove Township.

It is in northern Salem County, bordered to the northeast by Oldmans Creek, which separates the community from Woolwich Township in Gloucester County. The New Jersey Turnpike passes through the northern part of the CDP, just south of Auburn village.

Auburn was first listed as a CDP prior to the 2020 census.

Demographics

References 

Census-designated places in Salem County, New Jersey
Census-designated places in New Jersey
Unincorporated communities in Salem County, New Jersey
Unincorporated communities in New Jersey
Oldmans Township, New Jersey
Pilesgrove Township, New Jersey